Calycocarpum (cupseed) is a monotypic genus of plants in the family Menispermaceae. The only species currently accepted is Calycocarpum lyonii endemic to the southeastern United States.

Calycocarpum lyonii has been reported from Texas, Louisiana, Oklahoma, Arkansas, southeastern Kansas, Missouri, southern Illinois, southern Indiana, Kentucky, Tennessee, Mississippi, Alabama, Georgia, northwestern Florida and southern South Carolina.  It grows mostly along stream banks in deciduous forests at elevations less than 350 m.

Calycocarpum lyonii is a vine climbing over other vegetation, often to the tops of tall forest trees. Leaves are broad, pentagonally lobed, up to 30 across and 25 cm long. Flowers are borne in racemes or panicles up to 35 cm long. Drupes are green, drying black, spherical to ellipsoid, up to 25 mm long.

References

Menispermaceae genera
Flora of the United States
Monotypic Ranunculales genera
Menispermaceae